Kunukku is an ancient Christian Keralite type of jewelry. Usually it is an earring made of gold. It consists of a circular thin chain with a small ball hanging from it. It is in the shape of an upside-down water droplet with a ball hanging at the end of it.

References

Kunukku  defined University of Pennsylvania - DCCMT Akkadian Glossary

Kunukku was referenced in the popular 1997 Booker Prize winning book, The God of Small Things by Arundhati Roy

Kerala
Cylinder and impression seals in archaeology